Yagam is an alternate name for yajna, a Hindu ritual of sacrifice. It may also refer to:

 Yagam (1982 film), a Malayalam-language film
 Yagam (2010 film), a Telugu-language film